Michael Charles Paye (born 30 July 1966) is an English former professional footballer who played in the Football League as a defender. He is currently a Director of Cray Wanderers, having previously served as joint manager. He made nearly 200 appearances for Cray between 1987 and 1991.

References

1966 births
Living people
English footballers
Association football defenders
Footballers from Lambeth
Charlton Athletic F.C. players
English Football League players
Cray Wanderers F.C. players